Joan Benedict Steiger (born July 21, 1927) is an American actress best known for her role as Edith Fairchild on General Hospital.

Early life and education 
Benedict Steiger was born in Brooklyn, New York and first performed at the age of seven at the Brooklyn Academy of Music. She continued her training at Rome Opera Ballet School before studying with acting coaches Robert Lewis and Stella Adler, founders of the Actors Studio in New York.

Career

Theatre
Her list of stage credits include acclaimed productions of contemporary offerings such as "Promises, Promises," "The Beauty Queen of Leenane," "Collected Stories" by Donald Margulies, P.J. Barry's The Octette Bridge Club, Horton Foote's The Traveling Lady, and Morris West's The World is Made of Glass, opposite Don Knotts in the comedy The Mind with the Dirty Man, and others.

Film
Benedict Steiger is also known for a classic bit from the original version of Candid Camera, where she played a lost tourist looking for directions from passersby. She was also part of the ensemble of the original Steve Allen Show, where she did double duty as the spokesperson for Hazel Bishop cosmetics. On daytime drama, she had regular and recurring roles on General Hospital, Days of Our Lives, and Capitol. She has a starring role the 2011 feature Dead Border.

Personal life
Joan Benedict Steiger is also known for her personal relationships, which are the basis for her one-woman show, The Loves of my Life. Steiger's first marriage was to actor John Myhers, best known for his work in How to Succeed in Business Without Really Trying. They were married from 1962 until Myers' death in 1992. Benedict Steiger is also the widow of the Academy Award-winning actor Rod Steiger, whom she married October 10, 2000. They appeared in two films together, A Month of Sundays and the telefilm The Flying Dutchman. Following Rod Steiger's death in 2002, Benedict Steiger's partner was actor Jeremy Slate, a veteran of over 80 films and television shows dating back to 1959, until his death in 2006.

Steiger lives in Malibu, California.

Filmography

Film

Television

References

External links
Official Site 

Actresses from New York City
1927 births
Living people
People from Brooklyn
People from Malibu, California
American soap opera actresses
American stage actresses
20th-century American actresses
21st-century American women